Gloria Johnson (born May 25, 1962 in Denver, Colorado) is an American politician and a Democratic member of the Tennessee House of Representatives representing District 13. Previously holding the seat from January 8, 2013 to January 7, 2015, Johnson won a rematch with Eddie Smith on November 6, 2018. She was sworn in on January 8, 2019.

Tenure
On November 15, 2021, Johnson tweeted that the chant, Let's Go Brandon chant critical of President Biden should be equal to burning of the United States flag. She wrote, "As a friend said, I think it should be equated with burning the flag, in essence, that’s what they are doing".

Electoral history

2011

2012

2014

2016

2018

2020

2022

References

External links
 Official page at the Tennessee General Assembly
 Campaign site
 
 Gloria Johnson at Ballotpedia
 Gloria Johnson at the National Institute on Money in State Politics

1962 births
Living people
Democratic Party members of the Tennessee House of Representatives
Politicians from Denver
Politicians from Knoxville, Tennessee
University of Tennessee alumni
Women state legislators in Tennessee
21st-century American politicians
21st-century American women politicians